Monsoon Mangoes is a 2016 Malayalam comedy film written and directed by Abi Varghese. The film stars Fahadh Faasil in the lead, with Iswarya Menon, Vinay Forrt, and Vijay Raaz in supporting roles. The movie was produced by Thampy Antony. The film was released on 15 January 2016.

The film was originally intended to have the title Bourbon Street, which was later changed to Njan D P Pallikkal and finally to Monsoon Mangoes.

Plot 
In a sleepy suburb of New Orleans, D.P 'Daveed' Pallikkal, an ambitious young man in his early 30s, wishes to be a film director. He attempts to make a film named Monsoon Mangoes after producing some unsuccessful short films. For this venture Daveed ropes in an old Bollywood actor who was a hero in a few films, who now lives to make ends meet. His attempts to create a The Seventh Seal sort of art film result in failure. He returns to a regular job. He finally attempts to re-edit the film with clippings from the lead actor's personal items. He tries to re-invent the actor's own life experience and stories for his Monsoon Mangoes. For this he uses a clip which he recorded before the actor's death as the centerpiece and material from his original film. The clip is a monologue of the actor expressing, "Cinema is not above a life and there are three types of people. Firstly, those who consider having a job and family is everything. Secondly, those find what they do is not enough and expands there horizons and makes contributions to the society and thirdly there are people who tries to expand there horizons and fails, but pursue them and fall in the journey before reaching the destination." Daveed orchestrates a public viewing for his film and a lot of people attend and appreciates it. This makes Daveed happy in realizing his dream.

Cast 

 Fahadh Faasil as D.P 'Daveed' Pallikkal 
 Vijay Raaz as Prem Kumar 
 Vinay Forrt as Miguel
 Tovino Thomas as Sanjay 
 Nandhu as D. Paulose
 Sanju Sivram as Koshy
 Iswarya Menon as Rekha
 Alencier Ley Lopez as Bombay Pathrose
 Thampy Antony as Shashankan Mutholi
 Josukutty as Daveed's uncle
 Sajini Sachariah as Daveed's mother
 Nick Blady as Carlos
 Beatrice Bindu

Music
The songs composed by Jakes Bejoy were released by Muzik 247 on 6 January 2016. There are four tracks on the soundtrack album, sung by Shreya Ghoshal, Vijay Yesudas, Rakesh Kishore, Jakes Bejoy, Udith, Muhammed Aslam, Jagdish, Abhishek, Mame Khan, and The Elfa Choir. The lyrics were penned by Jelu Jayaraj, Manoj Kuroor, and Raqeeb Alam.

References

External links
 

2016 films
Indian comedy films
Films about Indian Americans
2010s Malayalam-language films
Films scored by Jakes Bejoy